zFS was an IBM research project to develop a distributed, decentralized file system. It was a follow-on to the IBM DSF (Data Sharing Facility) project to build a serverless file system.

References 
 

Disk file systems
IBM file systems
IBM mainframe operating systems